The Melody of Love is a 1912 silent film short produced by the Essanay Studios. It starred Francis X. Bushman and was distributed by the General Film Company.

Cast
Francis X. Bushman - Maurice Eaton
Lily Branscombe - Isobel McIntyre
Frank Dayton - Mr. McIntyre, Isobel's Father
Bryant Washburn - Remsen Olmstead
William Walters - Physician
Howard Missimer -

See also
Francis X. Bushman filmography

References

External links
 The Melody of Love at IMDb.com

1912 films
Essanay Studios films
1912 short films
American silent short films
American black-and-white films
1910s American films